The Richmond Flying Squirrels are a Minor League Baseball team based in Richmond, Virginia. The team, which is a part of the Eastern League, is the Double-A affiliate of the San Francisco Giants major league club, and plays at The Diamond. The Flying Squirrels have been affiliated with the Giants since 2010, making it the longest-running active affiliation in the Giants organization among teams not owned by the Giants. The Squirrels were previously known as the Connecticut Defenders.

The Flying Squirrels mark affiliated baseball's return to Richmond after a one-year absence prompted by the relocation of the former Triple-A International League's Richmond Braves to Lawrenceville, Georgia in 2009, where they are now called the Gwinnett Stripers.

History

On September 23, 2009, it was announced that the Connecticut Defenders would leave Norwich for their current home at The Diamond in Richmond, Virginia, where they will continue seeking proposals for a new ballpark in the Richmond metropolitan area. The team name was changed to the "Flying Squirrels".

The name the Richmond Flying Squirrels was chosen through a Richmond Times-Dispatch readers' "name-the-team-contest," which ended on October 15, 2009. The name was submitted by Brad Mead of Prince George, Virginia. Other finalists were the Rock Hoppers, Hambones, Rhinos, Flatheads, and Hush Puppies. (The name Hambones was later ruled out of the contest after the city's uproar and the NAACP finding that "the Hambones"  could be seen as a derogatory term directed towards the African-American community.)

In conjunction with Major League Baseball's restructuring of Minor League Baseball in 2021, the Flying Squirrels were organized into the Double-A Northeast. In 2022, the Double-A Northeast became known as the Eastern League, the name historically used by the regional circuit prior to the 2021 reorganization.

Logo
The new Flying Squirrels logo was unveiled on December 1, 2009. It is a black, red, and grey flying squirrel with a patch in the shape of an "R" (for Richmond) on top of an acorn over its heart. The logo was designed by San Diego-based sports branding firm Brandiose. It was named the logo of the year by Ballpark Digest in 2010 and the best minor-league logo by Baseball America in 2015.

Season records
2010: 68–73 (5th), manager Andy Skeels
2011: 76–66 (2nd), manager Dave Machemer
2012: 70-71 (4th), manager Dave Machemer
2013: 70-72 (4th), manager Dave Machemer
2014: 79-63 (1st), manager Russ Morman
2015: 72-68 (3rd), manager José Alguacil
2016: 62–79 (5th), manager Miguel Ojeda
2017: 63–77 (5th), manager Kyle Haines
2018: 62–76 (6th), manager Willie Harris
2019: 55–84 (6th), manager Willie Harris
2020: Season canceled due to COVID-19 pandemic
2021: 57-56 (4th), manager Jose Alguacil
2022: 66-71 (5th), manager Jose Alguacil

Playoffs
2014 season: Defeated Akron, 3–1, in first round; lost to Binghamton 3–0, in championship round.
2022 season: Lost to Erie SeaWolves 2-0 in first round

Roster

References
Notes

Sources

 Eastern League Announces Relocation to Richmond for the 2010 Season – Official Eastern League Press Release
 Defenders relocating to Richmond – Minor League Baseball news story

External links

 Official website

Baseball teams established in 2010
Eastern League (1938–present) teams
Sports in Richmond, Virginia
Professional baseball teams in Virginia
San Francisco Giants minor league affiliates
2010 establishments in Virginia
Double-A Northeast teams
Squirrels in popular culture